Tori Go! Go! is a South Korean animated television series. It is a product of the major broadcaster KBS and the animation was done by Duru Fix, Gangwon Information and Multimedia corporation and DPS Corporation. The story centers on the girl character Tori Go! Go!, a high teen girls character squirrel.

Make information
Title: Tori Go! Go! (토리 GO! GO!)
Original make: Kim Na-kyeong
Genre: Comic sitcom
Mode: TV Animation Series of 17 parts, each 30 minutes (51 parts, each 10 minutes)
Made present: 2D Animation
Make: Duru Fix, Gangwon Information and Multimedia Corporation, DPS Corporation

Characters
Tori
Woori
Rori
Mother
Father
Jeongyeon
Boba
Gonggi Girl

Episodes
The English name is to the left of the Korean name.
Part 1: 300 Won/Tori & Beast/Mini Hen Meri (삼백원/토리와 야수/병아리 메리)
Part 2: Rain Day/Gonggi Play/Rori's Desk (비오는 날/공기놀이/로리의 책상)
Part 3: Terrible Wheel/Crash/Terrible Story (무서운 바퀴/상처/무서운 이야기)
Part 4: Cry it/Bicycle/We house 3 Sisters (억울해/자전거/우리집 세자매)

Voice actors
Lee Seon-joo
Kim Ah-yeong
Oh Joo-yeon
Kim Chang-ki

External links
KBS Tori Go! Go! Homepage
Tori Go! Go! at Mimanbu (Korean)

2006 South Korean television series debuts
South Korean children's animated comedy television series